Bembidion varium is a species of ground beetle native to Europe.

References

varium
Beetles described in 1795
Beetles of Europe